USS Mobile may refer to:

 USS Mobile, a former name of 
 , the former Confederate blockade runner Tennessee
, the former German liner SS Cleveland used to transport U.S. troops home from Europe after World War I
, a Cleveland-class light cruiser
, a Charleston-class amphibious cargo ship
, a Ticonderoga-class guided-missile cruiser
, an Independence-class littoral combat ship

United States Navy ship names